Gold Dust and Ashes is a book by Ion Idriess set in Bulolo in the New Guinea goldfields. It covers the history of gold exploration in the region, including occupation by the Germans, transfer to Australian governorship, the efforts of Cecil Levien to pioneer gold mining, and the role of New Guinea Airways in the industry.

References

1932 non-fiction books
English-language books
Books by Ion Idriess
Morobe Province
Australian non-fiction books
History books about Australia
Gold mining in Australia
Works about Papua New Guinea
Angus & Robertson books